Sea History is a quarterly magazine published by the National Maritime Historical Society (NMHS) focusing on naval and maritime history. The magazine was first published in April 1972. It is edited by Deirdre O'Regan.

References

External links
 Sea History Magazine

History magazines published in the United States
Quarterly magazines published in the United States
Magazines established in 1987
Maritime history magazines
Magazines published in New York (state)
Boating magazines